The following is a list of county routes in Hudson County in the U.S. state of New Jersey. For more information on the county route system in New Jersey as a whole, including its history, see County routes in New Jersey.

500-series county routes
In addition to those listed below, the following 500-series county routes serve Hudson County:
CR 501, CR 505, CR 507, CR 508

Other county routes

See also

References

 
Hudson